John Huger was the sixth intendent (mayor) of Charleston, South Carolina, serving two terms from 1792 to 1794. He laid the cornerstone of the Charleston Orphan House, one of the city's most notable buildings, on November 12, 1792. Before the Revolutionary War, he had been a member of the Commons House of Assembly and a member of the Council of Safety, the group that organized revolutionary movements in Charleston. The location of Huger's estate, Hagan Plantation, was included in an almost 5,000 acre conservation easement.

References

Mayors of Charleston, South Carolina
18th-century American politicians